Lingotto is the name of a district of Turin, Italy, as well as the name of the Lingotto building in Via Nizza. It once housed a car factory built by Italian automotive company Fiat and today houses the administrative headquarters of the manufacturer and a multipurpose centre projected by architect Renzo Piano.

History 

Construction of the building started in 1916 and it was inaugurated in 1923. The design by the young architect Giacomo Matté-Trucco, was unusual in that it had five floors, with raw materials going in at the ground floor, and cars built on a line that went up through the building. Finished cars emerged at rooftop level to go onto the 1.5km long test track. The construction was carried out by the company of G A Porcheddu.  It was the largest car factory in the world at that time. For its time, the Lingotto building was avant-garde, influential and impressive—Le Corbusier called it "one of the most impressive sights in industry", and "a guideline for town planning". 80 different models of car were produced there in its lifetime, including the Fiat Topolino of 1936.

By the late 1970s, the factory had become obsolete — having been superseded by the larger and more advanced Fiat Mirafiori factory — and a decision was made to finally close it in 1982. The closure of the plant led to much public debate about its future, and how to recover from industrial decline in general. An architectural competition was held, which was eventually awarded to Renzo Piano, who envisioned an exciting public space for the city. The old factory was restored into a modern complex, with concert halls, theatre, a convention centre, shopping arcades and a hotel. The eastern portion of the building is the headquarters of the Automotive Engineering faculty of the Polytechnic University of Turin. The work was completed in 1989. The track was retained, and can still be visited today on the top floor of the shopping mall and hotel.

Similar rooftop tests tracks exist, including; at Imperia in Nessonvaux in Belgium, and Palacio Chrysler in Buenos Aires, Argentina. From 1928 to 1958, Imperia had a track over 1 km long which was built partially on top of the factory.

Lingotto public transport
Torino Lingotto railway station is served by a number of regional train lines, as well as the Turin Metro (Lingotto M1).  It is a central hub, located close to Turin's hospitals (such as CTO Hospital (Turin)), parks (Castello Valentino) and the Lingotto shopping district.

The Lingotto M1 metro station was officially opened on March 6, 2011, connecting Lingotto with Porta Nuova M1 and other destinations.

In popular culture

The Lingotto building is featured extensively in the Alberto Lattuada film Mafioso (1962).

The original Lingotto rooftop test track features briefly in the getaway sequence in the film The Italian Job (1969).

Lingotto is the site of the Oval Lingotto, the speed skating venue for the 2006 Winter Olympics.

The building is also featured in the fourth episode of the 20th season of The Amazing Race, originally aired in the United States on March 11, 2012.

The building and test track was featured on the first episode of James May's Cars of the People.

References

External links

 Photos of Oval Lingotto
 Great Buildings Entry
 Google Earth view of Lingotto
 About the project of Lingotto Exhibition Center

Lingotto Building
Districts of Turin
Fiat Group factories
Motor vehicle assembly plants in Italy